London Buses route 149 is a Transport for London contracted bus route in London, England. Running between Edmonton Green and London Bridge, it is operated by Arriva London.

History 

Route 149 was introduced in 1961 to replace trolleybus route 649 between Waltham Cross and Liverpool Street station. In 1968 it was extended on weekdays to Victoria with some peak hour journeys extended from Waltham Cross to Flamstead End via Cheshunt. In 1970 the route was withdrawn north of Ponders End and in 1971 back to Edmonton, although a few peak hour journeys continued to serve Ponders End. Seven years later route 149 was re-extended to Ponders End at all times.

In 1985, it was withdrawn between Waterloo and Victoria, and further cut back to Liverpool Street in 1991 apart from a few early weekday journeys to Mansion House station. In the same year it was extended back to Waterloo during weekday peak hours. In 1998 the route was extended south from Liverpool St station to  London Bridge station. The service was converted to an articulated bus operation in 2004 with a fleet of Mercedes-Benz O530G and withdrawn north of Edmonton, with new route 349 taking over.

In 2005, route 149 was subject to intensive bus priority measures along the length of its route. A year later the route was used to test the iBus recorded announcements system to aid visually impaired passengers.

Wright Eclipse Gemini 2 bodied Volvo B9TL double deck buses were introduced on 16 October 2010 as part of the Mayor of London's policy to withdraw articulated buses  from London. The route was transferred to Tottenham garage and the peak vehicle requirement was increased to 36.

Arriva London has successfully retained route 149 with new contracts starting on 16 October 2010 and 17 October 2015.

New Routemasters were introduced on 17 October 2015. The rear platform remains closed at all times except for when the bus is at bus stops.

It is London's fourth busiest bus route as of 2015/16, having carried 14.1 million passengers.

In 2019, peak service frequency was increased from every eight minutes to every six minutes.

Crime 
Route 149 suffers from higher levels of crime than most routes in London. In the 2006-07 financial year the route had the sixth highest levels of reported incidents on the network. This was lower than in the previous year, when it was fifth.

In 2007, the route was highlighted as having extremely high levels of pickpocketing by London Assembly member Jeanette Arnold. Ken Livingstone, then Mayor of London, was called upon to increase policing on the route, but stated that pickpocket activity had in fact decreased between 2005 and 2007.

A vehicle on the route was involved in an accident in Tottenham on 15 September 2009 when a double-decker bus on route 243 crashed into it. The driver and four passengers were injured in the accident, as was the driver of the 243, but there were no serious injuries.

On 27 February 2010, a bus driver working on the route was assaulted by a passenger who had failed to alight at the correct stop. Two weeks earlier a driver on the route had been suspended for assaulting a pedestrian near Monument Station.

On 15 October 2015, a man was jailed for throwing a man's walking frame off a bus on the route and shouting racist and Islamophobic abuse at him.

Current route 
Edmonton Green Shopping Centre for Edmonton Green station 
Upper Edmonton 
White Hart Lane station 
Tottenham Hotspur Football Club
Bruce Grove station 
Tottenham Town Hall        
Tottenham High Road
Seven Sisters station  
South Tottenham station 
Stamford Hill
Stoke Newington station 
Rio Cinema
Dalston Kingsland station 
Dalston Junction station 
Haggerston station 
St Leonard's Hospital
Hoxton station / Museum of the Home  
Shoreditch Church
Shoreditch High Street station 
Liverpool Street station    
Wormwood Street
Fenchurch Street
Monument station 
London Bridge bus station for London Bridge station

References

External links

Bus routes in London
Transport in the London Borough of Enfield
Transport in the London Borough of Hackney
Transport in the London Borough of Tower Hamlets
Transport in the City of London
Transport in the London Borough of Southwark